Qurshaqlu (also Romanized as Qūrshāqlū) is a village in Owch Hacha Rural District, in the Central District of Ahar County, East Azerbaijan Province, Iran. At the 2006 census, its population consisted of 11 families with a total village population of 49 people.

References 

Populated places in Ahar County